Septian David Maulana (born 2 September 1996) is an Indonesian professional footballer who plays as an attacking midfielder or winger for PSIS Semarang.

Club career

Mitra Kukar
In December 2014, Septian signed a contract with Mitra Kukar. He made his debut on 5 April 2015 after replacing Jajang Mulyana in the 73rd minute, which ended 1–0 defeat against Persebaya Surabaya at Gelora Bung Tomo Stadium. In next match, he scored his first goal in the 35th minute against Gresik United. In 2015 season, he only played 2 times and scored one goal.

2016 season
On 14 May 2016, he scored his first goal of the 2016 season, scoring in a 1–4 away win over PS TNI at the Siliwangi Stadium. On 10 June, he scored equalizer in a 3–2 home win over rival Pusamania Borneo. In 2016 season, he had a good season in his first club with 29 appearances and scored five goals.

2017 season
Septian scored his first goal of the new season on 15 April 2017, opening the scoring from header in a 2–1 lose with South Kalimantan club PS Barito Putera. On 28 April, he give assists a equalizer goal by Marclei Santos in Mitra Kukar's 2–2 draw over Madura United. On 3 May, Septian scored his second league goal of the season, scoring in the 55th minute and give another assists to Anindito Wahyu in Mitra Kukar's 3–2 home win over Persela Lamongan.

On 15 June, he assisted a further two goals in Kukar's 3–1 victory over Persegres Gresik United. On 7 October, he was involved in Mitra Kukar's 2–4 away win over Persegres Gresik United, scoring in the 51st minute. He was subbed off in the 65th minute, for suffering an injury which would saw him recover, he said that this injury was already present before the national team training camp and against Sriwijaya. He then scored a free kick against Persiba Balikpapan on 10 November in the game week 34 of Liga 1, in a 3–2 lose at Batakan Stadium. Through his goal, he was paired to Portuguese international Cristiano Ronaldo, because of similar knuckleball free kick technique, as well as being the best goal of the 2017 Liga 1 season. He won the award when it was announced at the Liga 1 Awarding Night event at Mulia Hotel, Senayan, Jakarta on 22 December. He beat goal nominations from Zulham Zamrun, Samsul Arif, Terens Puhiri, and Irfan Bachdim. Through the club official Instagram account, it was announced he would then extended his stay at the club until end the 2018 season. He contributed with 19 league appearances, scored 4 goals and 6 assists during his 2017 season.

2018 season
Septian scored his first goal of the 2018 season on 13 April 2018, in an home game against Madura United. The game ended in a 3–1 victory for Mitra Kukar. He added his second goals of the season eight days later with one goal against Persipura Jayapura in a 2–1 away lose. He continued his good form with the opening goal in a 3–1 victory over Bali United on 11 May at the Aji Imbut Stadium. He scored in a 3–0 home win against Sriwijaya at Aji Imbut Stadium on 18 July. He continued his good form in October with give assists a opening goal by Aldino Herdianto in a 1–3 away win over PSMS Medan on 23 October, whilst also scored who made it 2–0 in the 34th minute. And continued scored his second goal in October in a 2–0 home win against PSIS Semarang five days later. Through his personal Instagram account, Septian will officially not be with Mitra Kukar for next season, Septian is rumored to be with several clubs, namely Barito Putera and PSIS Semarang. Mitra Kukar this season must be relegated to Liga 2 after collecting 39 points from 34 matches. Naga Mekes closed the 2018 Liga 1 by being in 16th place in the league standings. Meanwhile, Septian could not contribute much to Mitra Kukar this season due to the Indonesian national team agenda. He contributed 21 league appearances and scored 6 goals.

PSIS Semarang
On 21 January 2019, PSIS Semarang announced a deal for Septian to join Indonesian Liga 1 club PSIS on a free transfer. On 5 February 2019, Septian made his first appearance in the Round of 32 2018–19 Piala Indonesia in a 2–0 home win against Liga 3 club Persibat Batang. He also scored his first goal for PSIS, where he scored in the 32nd minutes.

Septian made his first Liga 1 appearance on 16 May 2019, coming on as an starter in a 1–2 lost against Kalteng Putra.  He also scored his first league goal for PSIS, where he scored in the 20th minute. On 30 May 2019, Septian scored equalizer in a 1–1 draw over Persebaya Surabaya. In September 2019, with a market value of 3.6 billion rupiah, he's the most expensive player at PSIS Semarang. Septian give assists a winning goal by Heru Setyawan in PSIS's 0–1 away win over PSM Makassar on 11 September 2019. Septian  scored his third goal for the club in a 2–1 lose against Persija Jakarta four days later. Septian give another assists a opening goal by Bruno Silva in PSIS's 2–2 draw over Borneo on 26 October 2019. He continued his good form in November with scored in a 3–0 home win over PSS Sleman on 2 November 2019, the three points keep PSIS away from the relegation zone with 28 points from 25 matches. He also continued his good form in December with give assists a opening goal by Hari Nur Yulianto, whilst also scored a brace in a 5–1 big win against Arema on 8 December 2019. He contributed with 28 league appearances and 6 goals during with PSIS Semarang for 2019 season.

On 1 March 2020, he started his match in the 2020 Liga 1 season for PSIS, playing as a starter in a 2–0 lose over Persipura Jayapura. Septian only played 3 times for the club because the league was officially discontinued due to the COVID-19 pandemic.

Septian scored his first goal of the 2021–22 season on 15 October 2021, also give two assists in an 3–0 home win game against Persik Kediri. On 3 December, he scored the opening goal when the game was only in its 6th minute, scoring a free-kick in a 1–2 lose over PSS Sleman. By the end of the 2021–22 season, he was a starter in all of the club's Liga 1 fixtures, as PSIS finished in seventh place on the Liga 1 table.

Septian made his comeback to the squad, having previously been sidelined for a while due to a knee injury. In the match against Bhayangkara on 9 January 2023, Septian made his first appearance of the 2022–23 season, coming on as a substitute in the 72nd minute for Ridho Syuhada. Septian scored his first goal of the 2022–23 season on 4 February, opening the scoring with his acceleration past four opposing players in an away game against Persik Kediri. The game ended in a 1–2 victory for PSIS Semarang. On 17 February, Septian was a starter in Central Java Derby against Persis Solo at Jatidiri Stadium, also scored a penalty in the 79th minute in a 1–1 draw. On 1 March, he scored the opening goal, scoring a header in the 11st minute and give assists to Rizky Dwi Pangestu in PSIS's 3–2 lose over Bhayangkara.

International career
He was called up to the Indonesia national football team, and made his debut on 9 October 2016 in a friendly match against Vietnam at the Maguwoharjo Stadium, Sleman.

On 4 October 2017, he scored his first international goal for Indonesia in a 3–1 win against Cambodia in a friendly match.

Career statistics

Club

International

International goals 
Scores and results list Indonesia's goal tally first.

Honours

Club 
Mitra Kukar
 General Sudirman Cup: 2015

International
Indonesia U-23
Southeast Asian Games  Bronze medal: 2017
Indonesia
 Aceh World Solidarity Cup runner-up: 2017

Individual
Liga 1 Best Goal: 2017
Liga 1 Best Eleven: 2017

References

External links 
 
 

Indonesian footballers
Association football midfielders
Association football wingers
1996 births
Living people
Liga 1 (Indonesia) players
Mitra Kukar players
PSIS Semarang players
People from Semarang
Sportspeople from Central Java
Indonesia youth international footballers
Indonesia international footballers
Southeast Asian Games bronze medalists for Indonesia
Southeast Asian Games medalists in football
Footballers at the 2018 Asian Games
Competitors at the 2017 Southeast Asian Games
Asian Games competitors for Indonesia